Česká Lípa District is a district (okres) within the Liberec Region of the Czech Republic. Its district seat is Česká Lípa.

List of municipalities
Bezděz - 
Blatce - 
Blíževedly - 
Bohatice - 
Brniště - 
Česká Lípa - 
Chlum - 
Chotovice - 
Cvikov - 
Doksy - 
Dubá - 
Dubnice - 
Hamr na Jezeře - 
Holany - 
Horní Libchava - 
Horní Police - 
Jestřebí - 
Kamenický Šenov - 
Kozly - 
Kravaře - 
Krompach - 
Kunratice u Cvikova - 
Kvítkov - 
Luka - 
Mařenice - 
Mimoň - 
Noviny pod Ralskem - 
Nový Bor - 
Nový Oldřichov - 
Okna - 
Okrouhlá - 
Pertoltice pod Ralskem - 
Polevsko - 
Provodín - 
Prysk - 
Radvanec - 
Ralsko - 
Skalice u České Lípy - 
Skalka u Doks - 
Sloup v Čechách - 
Slunečná - 
Sosnová - 
Stráž pod Ralskem - 
Stružnice - 
Stvolínky - 
Svojkov - 
Svor - 
Tachov - 
Tuhaň - 
Velenice - 
Velký Valtinov - 
Volfartice - 
Vrchovany - 
Zahrádky - 
Zákupy - 
Žandov - 
Ždírec

References

 
Districts of the Czech Republic